Flums is a municipality in the Wahlkreis (constituency) of Sarganserland in the canton of St. Gallen in Switzerland.

It is close to a large shopping complex and also is the gateway to a large skiing resort called Flumserberg.

History
Flums is first mentioned in 765  as Flumini.

Geography

The municipality is located in the Sarganserland Wahlkreis. Until 2002 it was the capital of the Sargans district. In terms of area, it is the third largest municipality in the canton. Flums covers an area from the Schils valley to the border with the Canton of Glarus, part of the Flumserberge, part of the Seez valley, and the western slope of the Alvier chain. It consists of the village sections of Flums-Dorf, Grossberg, and Kleinberg.

Coat of arms
The blazon of the municipal coat of arms is Trierced per fess Or, Sable and Argent.

Demographics
In 2007, about 23.0% of the population was made up of foreign nationals. Of the foreign population , 20 were from Germany, 126 from Italy, 688 from ex-Yugoslavia, 14 from Austria, 46 from Turkey, and 77 from other countries. Over the last 10 years the population has decreased at a rate of -0.3%. , most of the population speaks German (86.9%), with Albanian being second most common (8.1%) and Italian being third (1.5%). , of the Swiss national languages, 4,242 speak German, 9 speak French, 75 speak Italian, and 4 speak Romansh.

 there were 493 persons (or 10.1% of the population) who were living alone in a private dwelling. There were 822 (or 16.8%) persons who were part of a couple (married or otherwise committed) without children, and 3,099 (or 63.5%) who were part of a couple with children. There were 220 (or 4.5%) people who lived in a single parent home, while there were 60 persons who were adult children living with one or both parents, 29 persons who lived in a household made up of relatives, 18 who lived household made up of unrelated persons, and 141 who were either institutionalized or lived in another type of collective housing.

In the 2007 federal election the most popular party was the SVP which received 52% of the vote. The next three most popular parties were the CVP (21.1%), the SP (10.9%), and the FDP (8.1%).

The entire Swiss population is generally well educated. In Flums about 57.1% of the population between age 25-64 have completed either non-mandatory upper secondary education or additional higher education (either university or a Fachhochschule). Out of the total population in Flums, the highest education level completed by 1,372 people (28.1% of the population) was Primary, while 1,465 (30.0%) have completed Secondary, 298 (6.1%) have attended a Tertiary school, and 274 (5.6%) are not in school. The remainder did not answer this question.

The historical population is given in the following table:

Heritage sites of national significance
The Gräpplang Castle (a prehistoric hilltop settlement and a ruined medieval castle), the Chapel of St. Jakob, and the catholic Church of St. Justus are listed as Swiss heritage sites of national significance.

Transportation

The municipality is located on the A3 motorway.

Economy
, Flums had an unemployment rate of 1.04%. , there were 339 people employed in the primary economic sector and about 152 businesses involved in this sector. 996 people were employed in the secondary sector with 65 businesses. 861 people were employed in the tertiary sector, with 149 businesses.  the average unemployment rate was 3.9%.  There were 354 businesses in the municipality of which 68 were involved in the secondary sector of the economy while 147 were involved in the third.  there were 1,403 residents who worked in the municipality, while 945 residents worked outside Flums and 664 people commuted into the municipality for work.

Religion
Of the rest of the population, there were 5 individuals (or about 0.10% of the population) who belonged to the Christian Catholic faith, 92 individuals (or about 1.88% of the population) who belonged to the Orthodox Church, and 30 individuals (or about 0.61% of the population) who belonged to another Christian church. There were 614 (or about 12.58% of the population) who were Islamic, 5 individuals (or about 0.10% of the population) who belonged to another church not listed on the census, 139 (or about 2.85% of the population) belonged to no church and were agnostic or atheist, and 137 individuals (or about 2.81% of the population) did not answer the question.

Notable people 
 Paul Kutter (1863–1937) was one of Luxembourg City's early photographers, born in Flums

References

Ski areas and resorts in Switzerland
Cultural property of national significance in the canton of St. Gallen